Gulehra Gali, also known as New Murree, is a village in Murree Tehsil, Murree District, Punjab, Pakistan. Gulehra Gali is the base station for Patriata chair lift.

References

External links

Populated places in Murree District
Murree